Anthony Sidney Fairbank Butcher (1 June 1926 – 20 August 2009) was an English rower who competed for Great Britain in the 1948 Olympic Games and won Silver Goblets at Henley Royal Regatta.

Butcher was educated at Cambridge University and rowed for Cambridge in the Boat Race in 1947. He became a member of Thames Rowing Club. He competed at the 1948 Summer Olympics in the coxless fours. Butcher recalled that at these post-war austerity Olympics, his kit was made by his mother from terry towelling. In 1949 he won the Silver Goblets at Henley, partnering Tom Christie. At the 1950 British Empire Games he was a member of the English eight which won bronze medal.

Personal life
Tony Butcher was married to wife Peggy and had four children, John, Adrian, David and Marilyn. He lived for most of his life in Beaconsfield.

See also
List of Cambridge University Boat Race crews

References

1926 births
2009 deaths
Cambridge University Boat Club rowers
English male rowers
Rowers at the 1948 Summer Olympics
Olympic rowers of Great Britain
Commonwealth Games medallists in rowing
Commonwealth Games bronze medallists for England
Rowers at the 1950 British Empire Games
Medallists at the 1950 British Empire Games